Invocations/The Moth and the Flame is a 1981 double album of improvised music performed by Keith Jarrett in two different sessions taking place in 1979 and 1980. Each album has a different approach, setting and conception. In Invocations (recorded at Ottobeuren Abbey, a Benedictine abbey in Ottobeuren, then part of West Germany), Jarrett plays soprano saxophone and pipe organ exclusively, while The Moth and the Flame (recorded at Tonstudio Bauer studios in Ludwigsburg, West Germany) is a solo piano suite. This double album was released by ECM Records in May 1981.

Invocations was performed on the same organ that Jarrett used for Hymns/Spheres. Regarding the recording date, Jarrett recalled: "Just being in the abbey is quite a frightening experience... Everything I played... was extemporaneous, and the two tracks on which I did a soprano-sax over-dub were like minor miracles. It was about forty degrees in there, and my horn felt like an ice cube."

Liner notes
As in other of Jarett's albums, this album includes poetry in its liner notes. The included poem is "When things are heard" by Rumi, translated by Robert Bly, although the poem is attributed only to Bly.

Reception
The Allmusic review by Richard S. Ginell awarded the album 3 stars, noting:

Writing for The New York Times, Stephen Holden commented that the album "finds the improvisatory pianist-composer at the peak of his powers", and that it offers "a striking aural clarity that is missing on even his most carefully recorded earlier albums. Clarity of tone and dynamic control have always been two of Mr. Jarrett's greatests assets as a pianist. And the new album reveals just how important hearing, as opposed to harmony and compositional structure, is to Mr. Jarrett's spiritually-attuned esthetic." Regarding "Invocations", Holden stated that it "conjures a dialogue between earthly and divine forces, as the saxophone calls forth the organ and the two instruments establish a call-and-response dialogue that contrasts the squealing, animal sounds of the horn with the solemn chords of the keyboard... the piece sustains a haunting spiritual atmosphere, while enabling Mr. Jarrett to summon aremarkable variety of sonorities from the two instruments." Concerning "The Moth and the Flame", he noted that it "consists of five discrete movements that are related stylistically. And the style has more to do with 19th-century Romantic piano literature than with the Bill Evans-influenced popjazz impressionism of earlier albums... The playing is seamless, with the notes cascading in an evenly spaced flow whose fluency and consistency of tone are extraordinary... Enhanced by the digital technology, Mr. Jarrett's chiming, oscillatory pianism has never sounded more impressive."

In an article for Between Sound and Space, Tyran Grillo wrote: "In this fascinating double album, a standout even in his extensive résumé, Jarrett fleshes a sparse skeleton with intimate venation... Equal parts hope and doubt, every word both a star and the supernova that ends it, 'Invocations' ranks among Jarrett's most introspective works... 'The Moth and the Flame' floats a thousand pianistic lotuses—and with no less grand a sweep... Jarrett maps out a tessellation of emotion... He winds his way with mirth through every dip of flight... This album, as much as any other in the Jarrett landscape, shows a deep commitment to personal development. He plows these instruments like the fields of his very heart. He is that moth, drawn to a musical flame which, rather than burning him, fuels his humanity all the more."

Jarrett biographer Ian Carr called the album "a superb package," and wrote: "both albums seem like prayers or invocations for his next musical odyssey." He suggested that the music can be heard as "a summary of Jarrett's recent past — improvised piano and organ albums taken a stage further — and a Janus-like pointer to the future, one indicating the classical repertoire direction, the other anticipating his return to fundamental musical essence... those great sources of inspiration, folk and ethnic music."

Track listing
All music by Keith Jarrett
Disc One: Invocations 
Ottobeuren Benedictine Abbey (West Germany), October 1980.
Trinity Organ by Karl Joseph Riepp
Keith Jarrett – pipe organ, soprano saxophone

 "Invocations-First (Solo Voice)" - 5:21 
 "Invocations-Second (Mirages,Realities)" - 8:58 
 "Invocations-Third (Power, Resolve)" - 7:32 
 "Invocations-Fourth (Shock, Scatter)" - 6:48 
 "Invocations-Fifth (Recognition)" - 5:04 
 "Invocations-Sixth (Celebration)" - 5:33 
 "Invocations-Seventh (Solo Voice)" - 3:04 
Total time: 42:51

Disc Two: The Moth and the Flame
Tonstudio Bauer, Ludwigsburg (West Germany), November, 1979.
Keith Jarrett – piano (Steinway)

 "The Moth and the Flame Part 1" - 6:58 
 "The Moth and the Flame Part 2" - 5:36 
 "The Moth and the Flame Part 3" - 8:23 
 "The Moth and the Flame Part 4" - 8:07 
 "The Moth and the Flame Part 5" - 9:42 
Total time: 39:31

Personnel 
Keith Jarrett – pipe organ, soprano saxophone, piano

production
 Manfred Eicher - producer
 Martin Wieland - recording engineer
 Gabor Attalai - cover photography "Round Fire"
 Barbara Wojirsch - cover design and layout

References 

ECM Records albums
Keith Jarrett albums
1980 albums
Albums produced by Manfred Eicher